Marc Fasteau is an American businessman, attorney, author, and political advocate.

A fictionalized version of Fasteau was portrayed by Adam Brody in the FX miniseries Mrs. America.

Personal life
Marc Steven Fasteau was born in Washington, D.C. In 1963 Fasteau graduated from Harvard College, then later in 1969 graduated Harvard Law School magna cum laude. While attending school he was an editor of the Harvard Law Review. Also while going to school, from 1963 to 1966, Fasteau served on the professional staff of the United States House Committee on Financial Services.

In 1968, Fasteau married Brenda Feigen, a Harvard Law classmate, in the Harvard Club of New York. He took the name Marc Feigen Fasteau, after Brenda changed her to Brenda Feigen Fasteau. After graduating from Harvard, Fasteau became volunteer general counsel and secretary of the Women's Action Alliance, which had been founded by his then-wife Brenda, Gloria Steinem, and Dorothy Pitman Hughes.

In 1974, the couple had a child who went on to graduate from UC Berkeley. Shortly after she was born, in September 1974, Fasteau published his first book The Male Machine, which was an examination of the damaging gender expectations faced by men. Then in 1987, Fasteau and Feigen divorced.

Fasteau went on to marry Anne Gerard Fredericks, an artist, art historian and former Wall Street professional specializing in the Japanese and other non-US equity markets.

Fasteau has advocated for stopping the Walter J. Koladza Airport near his home in Great Barrington, Massachusetts from perceived encroachment on surrounding residents, though some residents have seen this as an outside billionaire forcing his will on the community.

Career

Fasteau and Feigen 
In 1974, Fasteau opened a law partnership with his wife, Brenda Feigen Fasteau. The Partnership was a law firm called Fasteau and Feigen, located on Madison Avenue in New York City. Marc and Brenda planned to take on issues of gender, such as defending fathers who sought custody in divorces. Their notable cases include Ackerman v. Board of Education in 1974, where the Feigen Fasteaus defended Gary Ackerman, a father who sought paternity leave in New York City.

Business ventures
Fasteau went on to create the American Strategic Insurance Group, a property and casualty insurance group, which he initially served as Chairman of the board. 

Fasteau was an investment banker in New York for 14 years, most recently as the Managing director and partner at Dillon, Read & Co.

In August 2008, Fasteau joined the Board of directors of the Orion Society, a non-profit organization that engages environmental and cultural issues through publication of books, magazines, and educational materials, and facilitation of informational networks.

References

External links
 Marc Fasteau - Oxford Performance Materials - Board of Directors

Living people
Harvard Law School alumni
20th-century American writers
20th-century American businesspeople
People from Washington, D.C.
Male feminists
Fathers' rights activists
American civil rights activists
New York (state) lawyers
Year of birth missing (living people)